Murat Satin (born 30 August 1996) is an Austrian footballer.

Club career
On 11 August 2020 he signed a two-year contract with SV Ried.

References

External links

Murat Satin at ÖFB

1996 births
Austrian people of Turkish descent
Sportspeople from Innsbruck
Footballers from Tyrol (state)
Living people
Austrian footballers
Association football midfielders
Hacettepe S.K. footballers
FC Wacker Innsbruck (2002) players
SV Ried players
TFF Second League players
2. Liga (Austria) players
Austrian Football Bundesliga players
Austrian expatriate footballers
Expatriate footballers in Turkey
Austrian expatriate sportspeople in Turkey